Henri Hirschmann, real name Henri Herblay (30 April 1872 – 3 November 1961), was a French composer of light music.

Originally a student of André Gedalge at the Conservatoire de Paris, he studied under Jules Massenet for two years. His best known work is La Petite Bohème, from the novel Scènes de la vie de bohème by Henri Murger, which premiered 19 January 1905 at the Théâtre des Variétés in Paris.

In 1893 he was awarded the Prix Rossini by the French Académie des Beaux-Arts.

Main works 
1897: Amour à la Bastille 
 Lovelace
1904: Les Hirondelles
1905: La Petite Bohème, libretto by Paul Ferrier after Murger, théâtre des Variétés
1905: Rolande 
1908: Hernani
1911: La Danseuse de Tanagra

External links 
 Henri Hirschmann on Jewish Encyclopedia
 Henry Hirschmann on Stanford University Libraries
 Henry Hirschmann on Welt des operette
 Henri Hirschmann on data.bnf.fr

1872 births
1961 deaths
French male classical composers
French operetta composers
People from Saint-Mandé
19th-century French composers
19th-century classical composers
19th-century French male musicians
20th-century French composers
20th-century classical composers
20th-century French male musicians
Conservatoire de Paris alumni